Karalla is a genus of marine ray-finned fishes, ponyfishes from the family Leiognathidae which are native to the Indian Ocean and the western Pacific Ocean.

Species
There are currently two recognized species in this genus:
 Karalla daura (G. Cuvier, 1829) (Goldstripe ponyfish)
 Karalla dussumieri (Valenciennes, 1835) (Dussumier's ponyfish)

References

 
Leiognathidae
Taxa named by Prosanta Chakrabarty
Ray-finned fish genera